Megalosphecia is a genus of moths in the family Sesiidae.

Species
Megalosphecia callosoma Hampson, 1919
Megalosphecia gigantipes Le Cerf, 1916

References

Sesiidae